John Robson (12 July 1933 – 25 February 2011) was  a former Australian rules footballer who played with Richmond and St Kilda in the Victorian Football League (VFL).

Notes

External links 		
		
		
		
		
		
		
		
1933 births		
2011 deaths		
Australian rules footballers from Tasmania		
Richmond Football Club players		
St Kilda Football Club players
Glenorchy Football Club players